The 2017–18 Arizona Coyotes season was the 39th season for the National Hockey League franchise that was established on June 22, 1979, the 22nd season since the franchise relocated from Winnipeg following the 1995–96 NHL season, and the 46th overall, including the World Hockey Association years.

Off-season
On June 22, 2017, the Coyotes announced they have mutually parted ways with head coach Dave Tippett. He was named the team's 17th head coach on September 24, 2009. During his tenure, the team went 282–257–83, and made the postseason three times, but only won two series.

Standings

Schedule and results

Preseason
The team's preseason schedule was released on June 15, 2017.

Regular season
The team's regular season schedule was published on June 22, 2017.

Player statistics
Final
Skaters

Goaltenders

†Denotes player spent time with another team before joining the Coyotes. Stats reflect time with the Coyotes only.
‡Traded mid-season
Bold/italics denotes franchise record

Transactions
The Coyotes have been involved in the following transactions during the 2017–18 season.

Trades

Notes:
  Arizona to retain 15% of salary as part of trade.

Free agents acquired

Free agents lost

Claimed via waivers

Lost via waivers

Players released

Lost via retirement

Player signings
The following players were signed by the Coyotes. Two-way contracts are marked with an asterisk (*).

Draft picks

Below are the Arizona Coyotes' selections at the 2017 NHL Entry Draft, to be held on June 23 and 24, 2017 at the United Center in Chicago.

Notes:
 The Minnesota Wild's first-round pick went to the Arizona Coyotes as the result of a trade on February 26, 2017 that sent Martin Hanzal, Ryan White and a fourth-round pick in 2017 to Minnesota in exchange for Grayson Downing, a second-round pick in 2018, a conditional fourth-round pick in 2019 and this pick.
 The Philadelphia Flyers' second-round pick went to the Arizona Coyotes as the result of a trade on June 24, 2017 that sent a second-round pick in 2017 (35th overall) to Philadelphia in exchange for a third-round pick in 2017 (75th overall), the Islanders' fourth-round pick in 2017 (108th overall) and this pick.
 The Detroit Red Wings' third-round pick went to the Arizona Coyotes as the result of a trade on June 20, 2016 that sent Maxim Letunov and a sixth-round pick in 2017 to San Jose in exchange for a fourth-round pick in 2016 and this pick.
 The Philadelphia Flyers' third-round pick went to the Arizona Coyotes as the result of a trade on June 24, 2017 that sent a second-round pick in 2017 (35th overall) to Philadelphia in exchange for a second-round pick in 2017 (44th overall), the Islanders' fourth-round pick in 2017 (108th overall) and this pick.
 The Calgary Flames' third-round pick will go to the Arizona Coyotes as the result of a trade on February 20, 2017 that sent Michael Stone to Calgary in exchange for a conditional fifth-round pick in 2018 and this pick.
 The New York Islanders' fourth-round pick went to the Arizona Coyotes as the result of a trade on June 24, 2017 that sent a second-round pick in 2017 (35th overall) to Philadelphia in exchange for a second and third-round picks both in 2017 (44th and 75th overall) and this pick.
 The Vancouver Canucks' fifth-round pick went to the Arizona Coyotes as the result of a trade on June 24, 2017 that sent Calgary's third-round pick in 2017 (78th overall) to Edmonton in exchange for St. Louis' third-round pick in 2017 (82nd overall) and this pick.

References

Arizona Coyotes seasons
Arizona Coyotes
Arizona Coyotes
Arizona Coyotes